Arphia behrensi, the California sulphur-winged grasshopper, is a species of band-winged grasshopper in the family Acrididae. Is is found in California along the Sierra Nevada, the San Francisco Bay Area, and north of the Bay Area.

It is 22-40 mm long and has yellow hind wings.

References

Oedipodinae
Articles created by Qbugbot
Insects described in 1884